Robert Malcolm Graham (born February 23, 1945) is an American former professional basketball player. He played two seasons in the National Basketball Association (NBA).

A 6'1" guard from New York University, Graham won two NBA championships as a member of the Boston Celtics from 1967 to 1969.  He scored 327 points in his career.  

Graham's promising career was cut short by a medical condition just as the first era of Celtic domination of the NBA was coming to an end.  He retired from basketball and became a prominent jurist.  His playing days ended with those of Hall of Famer, Bill Russell. After his career he worked as a lawyer specializing in civil litigation and labor & administrative law. In 1982 he was named a judge in the Massachusetts court system, and served in several capacities as a judge until his retirement in 2015.

References

External links
Career statistics

1945 births
Living people
All-American college men's basketball players
American men's basketball players
Basketball players from New York (state)
Boston Celtics draft picks
Boston Celtics players
Massachusetts state court judges
NYU Violets men's basketball players
People from White Plains, New York
Point guards
Sportspeople from Westchester County, New York
White Plains High School alumni